

The Wellness Trail is a shared use path for cyclists and pedestrians running alongside the Deer Park Bypass in the western suburbs of Melbourne, Victoria, Australia.

The trail is named the Wellness Trail  and is signed as such, once only, at its most easterly end. Regardless of this naming, the trail is signed as the Western Fwy Path from one end to the other. Adding to the confusion is that it connects to the Western Ring Road Trail.

Following the path
The path meets the Western Ring Road Trail on the south side of the bypass at Fitzgerald Rd. It crosses to the north side at Mt Derrimut Rd, crosses Robinsons Rd, turns north to cross Riding Boundary Rd and finishes at the Western Highway at Caroline Springs. The trail features six rest stops with thirty mosaics on the subject of mental health, created by patients at Sunshine Hospital.

Connections
Path to Caroline Springs at the Western Highway in the north and the Western Ring Road Trail in the south east.

References

External links
http://www.vicroads.vic.gov.au/Home/RoadsAndProjects/RoadProjects/WesternSuburbs/DeerParkBypass.htm

Bike paths in Melbourne